Personal finance software can be used to track spending, create budgets, and plan for future expenses. Some software differs by feature support, software code and development transparency, mobile app features, import methods, Monetization model, privacy and data storage practices.

Risks 
The use of expense tracking, budgeting, and other personal finance software carries some risk, most notably is due to the disclosure of a username, password, or other account credentials used to automatically synchronize banking information with an expense tracking application. Another significant area of risk is due to sensitive personal information that is stored anytime data is digitized. This risk may be compounded based on the security the software vendor has implemented as well as the availability of the data and where specifically it is stored (online or a local application). An often overlooked form of risk is due to the monetization model and privacy practices of the vendor or software provider, whether the application is "free" or fee based. Open source software is one way of potentially minimizing the risks of privacy and monetization related risks of data exposure.

The following is a list of personal financial management software. The first section is devoted to free and open-source software, and the second is for proprietary software.

Free and open-source personal financial management software

Proprietary personal financial management vendors and software 
{| class="wikitable"
|+
!Name
!Spending Tracking
!Budgeting
!Investment Tracking
!Third-Party Bill Paying
!Operating Systems
!Mobile Support
!Software Type
!Direct Cost
!Other Monetization Models
!Description
|-
|Banktivity
|Yes
|Yes
|Yes
|Yes
|macOS
|iOS
|Stand alone
|Yearly Fee
|
|Personal finance software for Mac OS.
|-
|Mint
|Yes
|Yes
|Yes
|No
|Any
|iOS, Android
|Web-Based
|Free
|Financial product referrals
|
|-
|Moneydance
|Yes
|
|Yes
|
|Any (JVM based)
|
|Stand alone
|
|
|
|-
|Moneyspire
|
|
|
|
|
|
|
|
|
|
|-
|MoneyWiz
|Yes
|Yes
|Yes
|No
|macOS
|iOS
|Stand alone
|Yearly Fee
|
|
|-
|Personal Capital
|Manual or Automated
|
|Yes
|No
|Any
|
|Web-Based
|Free
|Fee-based in-house financial planning. Primarily a wealth management company that provides free services to non-clients.
|Offers financial advising for a fee, which establishes a client-fiduciary relationship that they claim makes them less incentivized to sell private client data as they are bound by law to act in their client's best interests.
|-
|Quicken
|Manual or Automated
|Yes
|Yes
|Yes
|Windows, macOS (limited)
|Android, iOS
|Stand alone or Web-Based for full functionality
|Yearly fee
|
|
|-
|You Need a Budget
|Manual or Automated
|Yes
|Yes
|No
|Any
|Android, iOS, Apple Watch, Alexa
|Web-Based
|Yearly or Monthly Fee
|
|Differentiates itself by providing budgeting advice.
|}

See also
 Comparison of accounting software
 List of free and open-source software packages
 List of project management software

References

Personal financial software
Free accounting software